Milesia dearmata is a species of hoverfly in the family Syrphidae.

Distribution
Philippines.

References

Insects described in 1990
Eristalinae
Diptera of Asia